Adam King may refer to:

 Adam King (footballer),  Scottish footballer
 Adam King (Canadian politician), Canadian politician 
 Adam King (congressman), US congressman
 Adam King (cricketer), English cricketer

See also
Adam King Hodgins, Canadian politician